Delia Owens (born c. 1949) is an American author, zoologist, and conservationist. She is best known for her 2018 novel Where the Crawdads Sing.

Owens was born and raised in Southern Georgia, where she spent most of her life in or near true wilderness. She received a Bachelor of Science degree in zoology from the University of Georgia, and a PhD in animal behavior from the University of California, Davis.

Owens met Mark Owens in a protozoology class at the University of Georgia when they were both graduate students studying biology. They married in 1973, and in 1974 moved to South Africa to study animals in the Kalahari Desert and Zambia. She wrote about Africa in her memoirs Cry of the Kalahari, The Eye of the Elephant, and Secrets of the Savanna. The couple were expelled from Botswana and are wanted for questioning in Zambia in relation to a murder investigation. They are no longer married. Since returning to the United States, Delia Owens has been involved in bear conservation.

Her debut novel, Where the Crawdads Sing, was released in 2018. It became one of the best-selling books of all time. It was adapted into a 2022 film of the same name.

Biography
Owens grew up in Thomasville which is in southern Georgia; she has mostly lived in or near true wilderness. She and her then husband, Mark, were biology students at the University of Georgia; she received a Bachelor of Science in zoology there and a PhD in animal behavior from the University of California, Davis. She knew she wanted to be a writer however she decided on a career in science. 

The couple moved to Africa in 1974, travelling for some time before making camp in the Kalahari Desert, Botswana. Cry of the Kalahari was written about the couple's experience there. After they campaigned against the local cattle industry, Botswanan government officials expelled them from the country. The Owenses then settled in North Luangwa National Park, Zambia, and later in Mpika, Zambia in the early 1990s.

Since completing her PhD in biology, Owens has published her studies of African wildlife behavioral ecology in professional journals, including Nature, the Journal of Mammalogy, Animal Behaviour, and the African Journal of Ecology. She has also contributed articles to Natural History and International Wildlife.

Delia and Mark Owens are divorced. For many years, Delia lived in Boundary County, Idaho which is twenty miles from Canada. However in 2019–2020, she moved to a former horse farm near Asheville, North Carolina.

Owens is the co-founder of the Owens Foundation for Wildlife Conservation in Stone Mountain, Georgia. She has also worked as a roving editor for International Wildlife, lectured throughout North America and participated in conservation efforts for the grizzly bear throughout the United States.

She released her debut novel, Where the Crawdads Sing, in 2018, which topped The New York Times Fiction Best Sellers of 2019 and The New York Times Fiction Best Sellers of 2020 for 32 non-consecutive weeks and was on the list for 135 weeks in total. It also gave rise to a successful feature film.

Zambian murder case 
Owens' former husband, Mark, has been accused of operating a "shoot to kill" policy against poachers while the couple were living in Zambia. ABC News aired a report in 1996, entitled "Deadly Game: The Mark and Delia Owens Story". The report featured the killing of a poacher in Zambia, allegedly committed by Delia's stepson, Christopher. To this day, Delia Owens denies the incident, explaining she was not involved, and there was never a case. However, her 2018 best selling novel, Where the Crawdads Sing, has aroused suspicion from those on her book tour about the parallels between the main character Kya and her case, and Delia's own alleged accusation. In the year 2022, Reese Witherspoon has taken movie rights for her production company to bring the novel to the screen. After the movie was released in July 2022, Zambia confirmed the murder case was still open and Delia, Christopher, and Mark Owens were still wanted in Zambia for questioning. The Owenses have denied the accusations. No charges were brought against Owens or her ex-husband Mark, or stepson Christopher. Zambian officials told Jeffery Goldberg, a journalist and editor-in-chief of The Atlantic Magazine, that they don't believe Owens is a suspect. However, they do believe that she is the most important witness.

Awards and honors
1981 — Rolex Award for Enterprise for Kalahari Research Project (with former husband, Mark Owens)
1985 — John Burroughs Award (with Mark Owens)
1993 — University of California Outstanding Alumnus Award
1994 — Order of the Golden Ark (Netherlands)

Bibliography

Novels 
 Where the Crawdads Sing (2018)

Memoirs 
 Cry of the Kalahari (1984)
 The Eye of the Elephant (1992)
 Secrets of the Savanna (2006)

See also
 Ethology in fiction – animal behavior in fiction, as exemplified by the account in Where the Crawdads Sing

References

External links

1949 births
Living people
20th-century American women writers
21st-century American women writers
21st-century American novelists
American women novelists
University of Georgia alumni
University of California, Davis alumni
Women conservationists
American conservationists
American expatriates in Zambia
American non-fiction environmental writers
Women zoologists
21st-century American zoologists
People from Thomasville, Georgia
Women ethologists